Darreh Ru Ab (also Romanized as Darreh Rū Āb; also known as Darreh Rūbāh) is a village in Milas Rural District, in the Central District of Lordegan County, Chaharmahal and Bakhtiari Province, Iran. At the 2006 census, its population was 33, in 10 families.

References 

Populated places in Lordegan County